Crooked Creek Township was a township in Boone County, Arkansas, United States. Named for Crooked Creek, its last appearance was on the United States Census of 1930.

Demographics

References
 United States Census Bureau 2008 TIGER/Line Shapefiles
 
 United States National Atlas

Further reading

External links
 City-Data.com
 US-Counties.com

19th-century establishments in Arkansas
20th-century disestablishments in Arkansas
Former populated places in Arkansas
Populated places established in the 19th century
Populated places disestablished in the 20th century
Townships in Arkansas
Townships in Boone County, Arkansas